Human Clay is the second studio album by American rock band Creed, released on September 28, 1999, through Wind-up Records. Produced by John Kurzweg, it was the band's last album to feature Brian Marshall, who left the band in August 2000, until 2009's Full Circle.

The album earned mixed to positive reviews from critics and was a massive commercial success, peaking at number one on the US Billboard 200 and staying there for two weeks. The album spawned two singles that peaked in the top 10 of the Billboard Hot 100: "Higher", which peaked at number 7, and "With Arms Wide Open", their only number one single. The album sold over 11.5 million copies in the US alone and over 20 million worldwide, making it the best selling album of Creed's career and one of the best-selling albums in the United States.

Overview
Human Clay is the only Creed album to not have a title track. The album had three music videos created for it: "Higher" and "What If" in 1999, and "With Arms Wide Open" in 2000.

During the summer of 2000, bassist Brian Marshall began a spiral into alcoholism and addiction. While under the influence, Marshall threatened to beat up guitarist Mark Tremonti, began missing band obligations, and attacking Stapp both verbally and online. The band had a meeting with management to discuss Marshall's future. Stapp and Tremonti supported Marshall going to rehab and attempted to talk Marshall into going, but at that point, Marshall was too far gone to recognize he needed help. Brett Hestla of Virgos Merlot was initially contacted to "fill in" while Marshall went to rehab, but that never happened. Initially, the public thought Marshall was let go because he criticized Pearl Jam frontman Eddie Vedder in a radio interview with KNDD in June 2000, claiming that Scott Stapp is a better songwriter, and criticized Pearl Jam's recent albums for "having songs without hooks." Stapp later distanced the rest of the band from Marshall's comments and stated, "Yes, we get tired of the PJ question, but there is no excuse for the arrogance and stupidity [of Marshall]. I ask you all not to judge Creed as a band, because the statements made were not the band's feelings, they were Brian's. I'm sorry if Brian offended anyone, and he has already apologized for his comments." Although it was reported Marshall left Creed "on friendly terms," he didn't. Tremonti and Stapp were concerned for Marshall and their collective friendships, but soon after the controversy, Marshall formed a new band called Grand Luxx with his old Mattox Creed bandmates. Marshall was temporarily replaced by touring bassist Brett Hestla. Stapp stated Marshall's leaving was his choice and was unrelated to the Pearl Jam comments. Mark Tremonti filled as the bassist on their third album, Weathered, while Brett Hestla became their touring bassist. Marshall later reunited with the band in 2009.

Title and artwork
The title of the album comes from a lyric in "Say I" ("The dust has finally settled on the field of human clay"), a song which carries the same message. The cover artwork was designed by Mark Tremonti's brother Daniel, who had previously done the artwork and photography for My Own Prison. According to Mark Tremonti, the album cover represents a crossroad which every man finds himself at in his life and the man of clay represented "our actions, that what we are is up to us, that we lead our own path and make our own destiny."

Release and reception

Commercial performance
The album was the band's first to hit number one in the US, where it debuted with first week sales of 315,000, and stayed on top for two weeks. Human Clay has been certified 11× Platinum and Diamond by the RIAA, and is the 54th best-selling album of all time in the United States (as of February 2007). It ranks as the tenth best selling album in the U.S. since the advent of Nielsen SoundScan in 1991, and the ninth best-selling album in the U.S. in the 2000s. It has also been certified 6 times platinum in Canada, 5 times in Australia, 7 times in New Zealand, and 4 times in Switzerland among others, selling an estimated 20 million copies worldwide. The album has spent a record 104 weeks on the Billboard chart survey. As of October 2014, it has sold 11,690,000 copies in the United States alone, according to Nielsen SoundScan.

Critical reception
The album received mixed to positive reviews from critics. Allmusic's Stephen Thomas Erlewine gave the album 4 stars out of 5, concluding that "it may not be the kind of thing that knocks out critics or grunge purists, but it does deliver for anyone looking for direct, grunge-flavored hard rock."

Legacy
The album's third single, "With Arms Wide Open", won a Grammy Award for Best Rock Song in 2001. At the 28th Annual American Music Awards, Human Clay won the American Music Award for Favorite Pop/Rock Album. At the 2002 Billboard Music Awards, the album won the award for Catalog Album of the Year. Human Clay was ranked number 422 in Rock Hard magazine's book The 500 Greatest Rock & Metal Albums of All Time in 2005. Human Clay was ranked number 5 on Billboard's 200 Albums of the Decade in 2009. VH1 listed "Higher" as one of the greatest hard rock songs of all time in 2009. The music video for "With Arms Wide Open" was voted the 92nd best music video of all-time by VH1, who also ranked it number 4 on its "25 Greatest Power Ballads" list.

Track listing

Original release

Deluxe edition

Personnel

Creed
 Scott Stapp – lead vocals
 Mark Tremonti – guitar, backing vocals
 Brian Marshall – bass
 Scott Phillips – drums

Additional musicians
 John Kurzweg – B-3 organ on "Wrong Way"
 Kirk Kelsey – Mandolin on "Wrong Way"

Technical personnel
 Jeff Hanson – executive producer, management at Jeff Hanson Management & Promotions
 John Kurzweg – production, engineering, mixing
 Kirk Kelsey – mixing assistant, mixing on "Wrong Way"
 Barrett Miller, Mark Kiczula, Steve Bearsley – assistant mix engineering
 Dana Cornock – digital editing
 Ted Jensen – mastering at Sterling Sound, New York City
 Joel Mark – A&R
 Daniel Tremonti (Three Mountain Design) – art direction, design, cover, additional photography
 Sacha Waldman – cover photography, additional photography
 J. Seward Johnson Jr. – "Crack the Whip" artwork

Charts

Weekly charts

Year-end charts

Decade-end charts

Certifications

Appearances
The song "Wrong Way" was featured on the soundtrack to the film End of Days in 1999.
The song "What If" was featured in both the movie and on the official soundtrack for Scream 3 in 2000, while the song "Is This the End?" was only included on the album.
The song "Higher" was featured in the films The Skulls in 2000, 22 Jump Street in 2014 and The Beach Bum in 2019, in trailers for the movie Titan A.E. in 2000, and as downloadable content for the video games Rocksmith 2014 in 2014 and Rock Band 2 in 2018.
The song "Young Grow Old" was featured on the album WWF Forceable Entry in 2002.
The song "To Whom It May Concern" was featured on the soundtrack to the film The Scorpion King in 2002.
The song "Are You Ready?" was featured on the albums NASCAR: Full Throttle in 2001 and Harley-Davidson: Ride in 2005.
The song "With Arms Wide Open" was featured in the movie Dark Waters in 2019; it was also included as downloadable content for the video games Rocksmith 2014 in 2014 and Rock Band 4 in 2020.

See also
 List of best-selling albums in the United States

References

Creed (band) albums
1999 albums
Wind-up Records albums